The Cianavelle is a short mountain river that flows through the Alpes-Maritimes department of southeastern France. It flows into the Cians near Rigaud.

The Cianavelle flows through the communes of Auvare, Puget-Rostang, and Rigaud.

References

Rivers of France
Rivers of Alpes-Maritimes
Rivers of Provence-Alpes-Côte d'Azur